Neoarius is a genus of sea catfishes found on and around the island New Guinea and Australia.  They are found in marine, brackish waters and fresh waters with several species restricted solely to freshwater rivers.  There are currently 10 described species in this genus.

Species
 Neoarius berneyi (Whitley, 1941) (Highfin catfish)
 Neoarius coatesi (Kailola, 1990) (Coates' catfish)
 Neoarius graeffei (Kner & Steindachner, 1867) (Blue salmon-catfish)
 Neoarius latirostris (W. J. Macleay, 1883) (Broad-snouted catfish)
 Neoarius leptaspis (Bleeker, 1862) (Salmon catfish)
 Neoarius midgleyi (Kailola & Pierce, 1988) (Silver cobbler)
 Neoarius pectoralis (Kailola, 2000) (Sawspine catfish)
 Neoarius taylori (T. R. Roberts, 1978) (Taylor's catfish)
 Neoarius  (Kailola, 1990) (Northern rivers catfish)
 Neoarius velutinus (M. C. W. Weber, 1907) (Papillate catfish)

References
 

 
Catfish genera
Taxa named by François-Louis Laporte, comte de Castelnau